In technical theater, spot rigging is the practice of using a fly system to fly something specific for a show which does not use the venue's standard rigging. For example, flying scenery on an ordinary batten would not qualify as spot rigging; flying a chandelier on a dedicated line would be. Likewise, if a wall were being flown in on a batten which was installed at an angle neither parallel nor perpendicular to the proscenium line, it would qualify as spot rigging, because custom setting of lift lines would be required.

Stagecraft